Galaxias is a genus of galaxiid fishes.

Galaxias may also refer to:
 Galaxias (supermarkets), a supermarket chain in Greece
 The Greek language term of the word "galaxy"
 Galaxias (Japanese band)
 Galaxias (novel), a 2021 science fiction novel by Stephen Baxter